Edmund Stephen Roper Piesse (5 January 1900 – 25 August 1952) was an Australian politician who represented Western Australia in the Senate from 1950 until his death. He was a member of the Country Party.

Piesse was born in Katanning, Western Australia, the son of Margaret Mary née Chipper and Arnold Piesse (a state MP). Three of his uncles, Frederick, Charles, and Alfred, and a first cousin, Harold, were also members of parliament in Western Australia.

Piesse attended Guildford Grammar School in Perth, before returning to Katanning as a farmer and grazier. He was also a company director. In 1949 he was elected to the Senate. He held the seat until his death by his own hand in 1952. He gassed himself in his car, at a rifle range near his home of Katanning. His father also committed suicide. Bill Robinson was appointed to replace him.

References

National Party of Australia members of the Parliament of Australia
Members of the Australian Senate for Western Australia
Members of the Australian Senate
1900 births
1952 deaths
People educated at Guildford Grammar School
People from Katanning, Western Australia
Australian politicians who committed suicide
20th-century Australian politicians
Suicides in Western Australia
Suicides by gas